The Division of Corangamite is an Australian electoral division in the state of Victoria. The division was proclaimed in 1900, and was one of the original 65 divisions to be contested at the first federal election. It is named for Lake Corangamite, although the lake no longer falls within the division's boundaries.

The division was redrawn in 2021, becoming a much smaller seat due to increased population growth.

Since the 2019 federal election, the current Member for Corangamite is Libby Coker, a member of the Australian Labor Party.

Geography
Since 1984, federal electoral division boundaries in Australia have been determined at redistributions by a redistribution committee appointed by the Australian Electoral Commission. Redistributions occur for the boundaries of divisions in a particular state, and they occur every seven years, or sooner if a state's representation entitlement changes or when divisions of a state are malapportioned.

History

Until the 1930s it was usually a marginal seat which leaned toward the conservative parties, but was won by the Australian Labor Party during high-tide elections. In 1918, it was the first seat won by what would become the Country Party.

It was held by the Liberals (and their immediate predecessor, the United Australia Party) without interruption from 1934 to 2007. A reasonably safe seat for most of the time from the 1950s to the 1990s, it became increasingly less safe from 1998 onward as successive redistributions pushed it further into Geelong. This resulted in the seat falling to Darren Cheeseman, the Labor candidate, by less than one percent at the 2007 federal election for the first time since 1929. Cheeseman was only the third Labor member ever to win the seat. Labor retained the seat in 2010 election against former journalist Sarah Henderson, making Cheeseman the first Labor MP to win re-election in the seat. Henderson sought a rematch in 2013, and won.

Henderson retained her seat in 2016 but a redistribution completed prior to the 2019 election pushed the seat further into Geelong. This resulted in the seat becoming notionally Labor, albeit with a very narrow margin. As Henderson failed to gain a swing towards her at the election, she lost the seat to the Labor candidate, Libby Coker. Coker's win in 2019 was historically significant, as it marked the first time that the non-Labor parties had been in government without holding Corangamite.

Prominent members include James Scullin, who later became the Prime Minister of Australia in 1929-32; Fraser Government Minister Tony Street, and longtime Liberal backbencher Stewart McArthur.

In 2018, the Australian Electoral Commission (AEC) published its report on the proposed redistribution of Victoria's federal divisions. The report proposed renaming Corangamite to Cox, after swimming instructor May Cox. Incumbent MP Sarah Henderson said the new name "has already prompted some ridicule on social media". In the commission's final determination, the decision was made to retain the name of Corangamite. In 2021, the AEC again proposed to rename Corangamite, this time to Tucker after Aboriginal activist Margaret Tucker, however in the final determination, the renaming proposal was also abandoned.

In July 2021, City of Greater Geelong Mayor and Bellairne Ward Councillor Stephanie Asher was preselected as the Liberal candidate for Corangamite. 
 However, Coker won a second term with 57 percent of the two-party vote, a swing of six percent. This was the strongest showing for Labor in the seat’s history.

Members

Election results

References

External links
 Division of Corangamite - Australian Electoral Commission
 https://web.archive.org/web/20101007120814/http://vtr.aec.gov.au/HouseDivisionFirstPrefs-15508-207.htm

Electoral divisions of Australia
Constituencies established in 1901
1901 establishments in Australia
Geelong
Barwon South West (region)